Sainte-Catherine may refer to:

Canada
 Sainte-Catherine, Quebec, a municipality of Quebec in Roussillon
 Sainte-Catherine-de-Hatley, a municipality of Quebec in Memphrémagog
 Sainte-Catherine-de-la-Jacques-Cartier, a municipality of Quebec in La Jacques-Cartier
 Baie-Sainte-Catherine, a municipality of Quebec in Charlevoix-Est
 Saint Catherine Street, a commercial street in Montreal, Quebec
 St. Catharines, Ontario

France
 Sainte-Catherine, Pas-de-Calais, unofficially Sainte-Catherine-lès-Arras, a commune in the Pas-de-Calais département
 Sainte-Catherine, Puy-de-Dôme, in the Puy-de-Dôme département
 Sainte-Catherine, Rhône, in the Rhône département
 Sainte-Catherine-de-Fierbois, in the Indre-et-Loire département

Transit
 Sainte-Catherine station (Exo), Saint-Constant, Quebec, Canada
 Sainte-Catherine/Sint-Katelijne metro station, Brussels, Belgium
 Sainte-Catherine tram stop, Bordeaux, France

See also
 Saint Catherine's Monastery
 St. Catherine (disambiguation)
 Santa Caterina (disambiguation)